Nikica Gaćeša (born 20 July 1983) is a Croatian retired football player..

External links
 
Nikica Gaćeša at playmakerstats.com (formerly thefinalball.com)

1983 births
Living people
Association football defenders
Croatian footballers
HNK Orijent players
HNK Segesta players
HNK Suhopolje players
Ħamrun Spartans F.C. players
Second Football League (Croatia) players
First Football League (Croatia) players
Kazakhstan Premier League players
Maltese Premier League players
Croatian expatriate footballers
Expatriate footballers in Kazakhstan
Croatian expatriate sportspeople in Kazakhstan
Expatriate footballers in Malta
Croatian expatriate sportspeople in Malta